The NIOSH air filtration rating is the U.S. National Institute for Occupational Safety and Health (NIOSH)'s classification of filtering respirators. The ratings describe the ability of the device to protect the wearer from solid and liquid particulates in the air. The certification and approval process for respiratory protective devices is governed by Part 84 of Title 42 of the Code of Federal Regulations (42 CFR 84). Respiratory protective devices so classified include air-purifying respirators (APR) such as filtering facepiece respirators and chemical protective cartridges that have incorporated particulate filter elements. 

The classifications only cover the filtration of particles or aerosols, not the air-purifying respirator's ability to remove chemical gasses and vapors from air, which is regulated under 42 CFR 84 Subpart L. For more information see Cartridge (respirator). The classifications assume that the respirator is properly fitted.

NIOSH classifications 

NIOSH has currently established nine classifications of approved particulate filtering respirators based on a combination of the respirator series and efficiency level. The first part of the filter's classification indicates the series using the letters N, R, or P to indicate the filter's resistance to filtration efficiency degradation when exposed to oil-based or oil-like aerosols (e.g., lubricants, cutting fluids, glycerine, etc.). Definitions and intended use for each series is indicated below.

 N for not resistant to oil. Used when oil particulates are not present. Tested using sodium chloride particles.
 R for resistant to oil. Used when oil particulates are present and the filter is disposed of after one shift. Tested using dioctyl phthalate (DOP) oil particles.
 P for oil-proof. Used when oil particulates are present and the filter is re-used for more than one shift. Tested with DOP oil particles.

The second value indicates the minimum efficiency level of the filter. When tested according to the protocol established by NIOSH each filter classification must demonstrate the minimum efficiency level indicated below.

HE (high-efficiency) labeled filters are only provided for powered air-purifying respirators.  These HE-marked filters are 99.97% efficient against 0.3 micron particles and are oil-proof, and therefore their filter-media material has the exact same specification as a P100 filter. 

Since filters are tested against the most penetrating particle size of 0.3 μm, an APR with a P100 classification would be at least 99.97% efficient at removing particles of this size. Particles with a size both less than and greater than 0.3 μm are filtered at an efficiency greater than 99.97%. (That statement does not derive from given reference).  Although it is counter-intuitive that particle sizes of less than 0.3 μm are filtered with a greater efficiency, the forces which have the greatest impact on the effectiveness of filtration (aerosol impaction, interception, and diffusion) are weakest at this size for filters tested by NIOSH. A filter's collection efficiency for particle sizes other than those for which it is least efficient is indicated by the filter's efficiency curve.

Similar standards 
A few other jurisdictions use standards similar to the NIOSH scheme to classify mechanical filter respirators. They include:
 China (GB 2626-2019): Similar testing requirements and grades. Has "KN" and "KP" resistance levels, 90/95/99. Has additional EU-like rules on leakage.
 Mexico (NOM-116-2009): Same grades.
South Korea (KMOEL - 2017-64):  EU grades, KF 80/94/99 for second/first/special

See also 
European respirator standards

References

Air pollution
National Institute for Occupational Safety and Health
Occupational safety and health
Respirators